Deponia Doomsday is a graphic adventure video game developed and published by Daedalic Entertainment. It is the sequel to Goodbye Deponia. The first three parts are considered a trilogy. This installment is "paralellic."

Gameplay
The game follows the principles of a classic point-and-click adventure: the user controls Rufus as he travels across highly detailed backgrounds as the plot continues. Rufus can startup conversations with other characters and put items in his inventory for later use. These items, combined or not, are used to solve puzzles and advance the story. Furthermore, the game has some optional minigames.

Story

Prologue
In the introduction, Goal briefly explains the history of Elysium. Her ancestors started a small settlement on Deponia. The settlement became a town, eventually graduating to a city. Buildings became higher and higher and technology improved. One day they built a spaceship called Elysium and left. During the following decades the Elysians forgot their own history and were sure Deponia was only a dumping ground where nobody lived anymore. That is why they wanted to blow up the planet. Things changed unexpectedly thanks to Rufus who convinced the Elders of Elysium that he lives on Deponia, thus confirming that the planet is inhabited. In an attempt to avoid the crash of Elysium onto Deponia, Rufus fell off of the spaceship and died. As a result, nobody is aware Rufus is the hero who saved Deponia. Goal finishes her story but wonders what she would change if she were able to travel back in time and if these actions could lead to a better ending to her story. Next, the game moves to Deponia, now an ice planet due to a nuclear winter, where an old Rufus, followed by the Fewlocks (a parody of the Morlocks from H. G. Wells 1895 novel, The Time Machine), arrives at the tower which should have destroyed Deponia in the original plan of the Elysians. Not much further, a fallen Elysium can be seen. Rufus activates the bomb which will explode the planet.

The game
The young Rufus awakes from a nightmare. He is about to leave to Elysium with an air balloon. He only has to wrap up some crystal glasses, currently standing outside, and to pick up his girlfriend Toni. Once outside, he gets déjà vu and thinks all of this happened before: the crystal glasses will be destroyed, Toni and he will split up and there is a conspiracy of the Organon. Not much later the glasses are indeed destroyed by the car of professor McChronicle: an expert in temporary physics and the fourth dimension. His car is actually a time machine to travel back at some point in near past. He is not eager to use the device as it will create a time split and the consequences are not fully known. Rufus activates the machine and time is turned back until some seconds before McChronicle arrives at the balloon. McChronicle arrives with the car and Rufus tries to give parking instructions. He is however distracted by a pink elephant thus the glasses are broken again. Rufus reactivates the machine, but identically the same scenario repeats. McChronicle is somehow astonished Rufus could remember the future: normally this is only possible when the time travelers wear a special hood, but he doesn't question further. Rufus also realizes everything that has happened in the Deponia-trilogy must have been a dream as the time frame in which those events take place still have to come.

Rufus and Tuck, a drunk, try to figure out a method how to catch the elephant in the past. They reveal the elephant is hiding in the abandoned shopping mall. After they catch the "animal" it turns out to be the oversized mother of Toni who suffers obesity on which Toni ends the relationship. Rufus leaves with the balloon alone but it catches fire. It crashes in the town and sets the other buildings in fire. Rufus meets the "real elephant" although it are some men in disguise as they do not want to reveal their real identity. They warn Rufus "everything should be exactly the same as it was before" but he catapults them away. Rufus and McChronicle find a time travelling shuttle in the mall. It is able to create wormholes and they decide to travel to Elysium, which they can select from the time-pod graphical user interface. However, they end up in a crashed Elysium. There he meets Goal, although she is some years older as in his dream. She also recognizes him. Rufus realizes the events in the Deponia-trilogy did/will take place.

McChronicle, Goal and Rufus use the time pod and end up in a lower part of Elysium when it was still intact. Goal remembers the day: it is the day on which her younger version and Cletus leave to Deponia to verify if it is still habituated. Goal steals the time pod, as she wants to change her fate, leaving Rufus and McChronicle behind. Rufus wants to stop the Goal of the current timeline from leaving to Deponia. That's why he wants to consult the "Elder Ones" but they only meet in a few days. Rufus needs to find out a way how to set up the meeting immediately. The "First Elder" is having a massage. The "Second Elder" only wants to cooperate in case Rufus is able to create a new friendly kind of pet by mixing DNA-samples of different breeds. Although Rufus is able to create such animal, he also creates the evil Fewlock. The "Third Elder" wants improvements in the quality of served food and drinks. The "Fourth Elder" only wants to have a meeting in case someone earns at least 10 000 points in the fun center or in case a disaster turns up.

Meanwhile, the DNA-machine created a lot of Fewlocks which are attacking Elysium so the council is set up. Rufus convinces them: if he travels some hours back in past, he can stop Goal and can prove he is an inhabitant of Deponia. The whole mission and plan to destroy the planet can be cancelled. In meantime the time was already turned back some times and McChronicle suspects someone is messing up with his car at Deponia which creates the repeating time loop. As long the time loop is not broken, current events will repeat for eternity. McChronicle thinks all of this can be undone in case he is stopped with his car on the day he is on his way to Rufus' town.

Rufus (disguised as her father) convinces Goal in one of those time loops not to go to Deponia and threatens to blow up Elysium. To his surprise, the Fewlocks also exists in this time loop although he has not created them yet. Rufus, Goal and McChronicle escape with a parachute and end up in a run-down amusement park. There Rufus wants to hire a "love boat" to travel to McChronicle's village, but the owner only allows this if Rufus can prove "he has a girlfriend for life", but Goal is not willing to cooperate, so he creates a dummy doll to take the picture.
Once in McChronicles's village, it turns out they are late. The McChronicle of this timeline left at least two hours ago. With help of some students, Rufus develops a machine to detect wormholes and another one to make such wormholes bigger so he fits them. One of those wormholes ends up in "interim time": a place with only a past and present, but no future. Over there he meets a retired version of Goal and McChronicle’s grandfather. After this world is also taken over by Fewlocks they are able to travel back to Deponia. They end up at the time he and McChronicle left after the city got in fire. Outside Rufus is hit by McChronicle's car, but not hurt. Owing to this action, McChronicle walks back home so the time loop with the broken glasses has ended. Next they are taken as prisoner by the "pink elephant": they are inhabitants of Utopia who are trying to undo the various changes to history, the people of Elysium was able to reach Utopia eventually without destroying Deponia, but Rufus' interference of the timeline caused the destruction of the Deponia which caused Elysium to crash into Utopia wiping out their species. They were the ones using McChronicle car and are the owners of the time-pod which was hidden in the mall. Not much later, the Rufus of this timeline also turns up. According to the Utopians there are multiple time loops which interfere with each other resulting the past already repeated uncountable number of times. Owing to all these time loops there are multiple versions of Rufus and Goal who all want to fix the future on their own way. The Goal-version who stole the time-pod earlier, always travels to the point where Rufus falls of Elysium. The second loop is the one Rufus created by using McChronicle’s car. In another time loop an old Rufus wants to destroy Deponia. However, the actual explosion never takes place as a time loop brings him back at the point where the young Rufus awakens thinking he had a nightmare. According to the Utopians there is only one way to stop all the loops. That is why Rufus returns to the time-stamp on which his alter-ego, disguised as Cletus, is about the fall from Elysium. There he convinces the current Goal and interfering Goal to let him and his alter-ego go so they fall down and die in the crash. Only in case both of them die, the time loops are broken and past will not repeat.

Epilogue
In the final scene the Utopians have taken Goal to the time-stamp on which Elysium crashed. She settles on Deponia and grieves on the knowledge that nobody will remember Rufus nor what he did to prevent the demolition of Deponia and that he is the true hero that saved the world and gave them back their future. She also wonders if there is another Goal having exciting and fun adventures with the other Rufus in another timeline somewhere and looks forward to finding out if that is true or not. For now, she decides to help her people build the civilization and the future Rufus made possible for his noble sacrifice.

Reception

Deponia Doomsday received "generally favorable" reviews, according to review aggregator Metacritic.

Adam Beck of Hardcore Gamer gave the game a 3.5 out of 5 saying, "Deponia Doomsday is a charming adventure that brings back all the humor from the past, but derives its puzzles on obscurities and trial and error."

References

External links

2016 video games
Daedalic Entertainment games
Linux games
MacOS games
Nintendo Switch games
PlayStation 4 games
Point-and-click adventure games
Video game sequels
Video games developed in Germany
Video games set on fictional planets
Windows games
Xbox One games
Single-player video games